Russell Kommer Myers (born October 9, 1938) is an American cartoonist best known for his newspaper comic strip Broom-Hilda.

Born in Pittsburg, Kansas, Myers was raised in Oklahoma where his father taught at the University of Tulsa. Myers was interested in cartooning from an early age. After his first strip submission for syndication failed, he began working for Hallmark Cards in Kansas City, MO in 1960 as an illustrator of greeting cards. He continued to submit comic strip concepts for syndication in his free time.

Broom-Hilda
The idea for Broom-Hilda originally came from writer Elliott Caplin, brother of cartoonist Al Capp, who described the character to Myers. Myers designed the characters and wrote the scripts. Caplin acted as Myers' business agent and submitted Broom-Hilda to the Chicago Tribune Syndicate where it was accepted. The first strip was published on 19 April 1970.

Personal
Russell and Marina Myers married in 1964 and lived in the Kansas City area until moving to Grants Pass, Oregon. The Myers family includes son Stewart and daughter Rosie. As Russell Myers noted, "We live in Oregon with seven dogs, three horses, and a pond full of koi and grow moss on our north sides. His hobbies include reading, collecting old cars, and hanging out at our local Saturday night dirt track, where I sponsor a car and wish I was brave enough to drive."

Awards
Myers received the 1975 National Cartoonists Society's Best Humor Strip Award.

References

External links
Tribune Media Services: Russell Myers

1938 births
American comic strip cartoonists
Chicago Tribune people
Hallmark_Cards_artists
Living people
People from Pittsburg, Kansas
Artists from Kansas
Artists from Oklahoma